Pitcairnia brunnescens is a plant species in the genus Pitcairnia. This species is native to Ecuador.

References

brunnescens
Flora of Ecuador